The Global Standards Collaboration (GSC) started life as The "Inter-regional Telecommunications Standards conference (ITSC) in 1990.  This was an initiative of the T1 Committee of the United States who invited the other founding partner organizations ITU-T, ETSI and the Japanese TTC to the first ISC Meeting in Fredericksburg, VA.  The goal was set by the “spirit of Melbourne”, stemming from a CCITT Plenary Assembly, to find a way of co-operation between Participating Standards Organizations (PSOs) from different regions of the world in order to facilitate global standardization within the ITU (International Telecommunication Union). The ITSC focussed its work on fixed telecommunications networks.

After a few years, the ITSC, as a conference, became too big and was therefore reduced to GSC, the Global Standards Collaboration, with delegations limited to a reasonable size (10 maximum). The first GSC meeting was held in 1994 in Melbourne, Australia.  Around the same time, it was decided to expand the scope to cover Radio Communications with the addition of a parallel set of Global Radio Standardization (RAST) meeting, the first one being hosted by ETSI in Nice in October 1994.

In the course of the time, the Australian, Canadian, Korean and Chinese national standards organizations joined bringing the number of Participating Standards Organizations to ten. Observers from other standards-related organizations and Fora are also invited to participate.

In November 2001, it was decided to rename GSC as GTSC (where T = Telecoms) and RAST as GRSC (where R = Radio) and to use the term GSC an overall "umbrella" for the combined plenary sessions.

GSC meets approximately once every year. GSC-16 was held in Halifax, Nova Scotia, from October 31 to November 3, 2011 hosted by the ICT Standards Advisory Council of Canada (ISACC).

Participating standards organizations

ARIB – Association of Radio Industries and Businesses (Japan)
ATIS – Alliance for Telecommunications Industry Solutions (USA)
CA – Communications Alliance Ltd (Australia) (withdrawn in 2010)
CCSA – China Communications Standards Association (China)
ETSI – European Telecommunications Standards Institute (France)
IEC – International Electrotechnical Commission (Switzerland)
IEEE – Institute of Electrical and Electronics Engineers (USA)
ISO – International Organization for Standardization (Switzerland)
ISACC – ICT Standards Advisory Council of Canada (Canada) (Withdrawn)
ITU-R / ITU-T – International Telecommunication Union (Switzerland)
TIA – Telecommunications Industry Association (USA)
TSDSI – Telecommunications Standards Development Society of India (India)
TTA – Telecommunications Technology Association (Korea)
TTC – Telecommunication Technology Committee (Japan)

GSC10 Open Standards Definition
According to the participating standards organizations, an open standard fulfills the following conditions:
Collaborative/consensus based development and/or approval
Transparent process
Inclusive
RAND/FRAND Intellectual Property Right (IPR) policies
Standard is published and made available to the general public under reasonable terms (including for reasonable fee or for free)

See also
Open standard
Open specifications
Standardization
Machine to machine

References

External links
 – ETSI Global Standards Collaboration
Global Standards Collaboration - Machine-to-Machine Standardization Task Force
www.itu.int/ITU-T/gsc/index.html – Global Standards Collaboration (GSC)
www.itu.int/ITU-T/gsc/gsc10/index.html – GSC10
www.etsi.org/WebSite/AboutETSI/GlobalRole/GSC.aspx – Global Standards Collaboration (GSC)
www.atis.org/gsc/index.asp  – Global Standards Collaboration (GSC)
www.tsdsi.org TSDSI Home - Global Standards Collaboration
www.lightreading.com/document.asp?doc_id=96760
Telecom, Radio Standards Organizations Identify Areas of Focus

Standards organizations
Telecommunications standards
Organizations established in 1990
1990 establishments in Virginia